The Nikon Z 7II is a high-end full-frame mirrorless interchangeable-lens camera (MILC) produced by Nikon, and is the successor to the Nikon Z 7. The camera was officially announced on October 14, 2020, alongside the Nikon Z 6II, and became available for purchase on November 5. It uses Nikon's Z-mount system.

Features 

 The most notable upgrade over the Nikon Z 7 is the inclusion of a second memory card slot. The Z 7II features an SD card slot and a CFexpress/XQD card slot.
 The camera features dual Expeed 6 image processing engines, a first for Nikon cameras. This improves autofocus performance and enables 4K video recording at 60 fps.
 Low light sensitivity has been improved to -3 to +17 EV.
 The frame rate for photos is increased from 9 fps in extended high-speed continuous to 10 fps with a larger buffer as well (increased from 23 12-bit lossless RAW files to 77).
 The electronic viewfinder refresh rate and blackout time is improved from the Z 7.
 The autofocus system has improved with a new Wide-Area AF option with eye autofocus for both people and animals.
 Battery life has been increased from 330 shots to 360 shots (or from 85 min to 105 min in video recording).
 In video recording, the camera can now record 4K "Ultra HD" footage at 60p with a 1.08x crop.

References

Z 7II
Z 7II
Cameras introduced in 2020
Full-frame mirrorless interchangeable lens cameras